The 1911 Wake Forest Baptists football team was an American football team that represented Wake Forest College as an independent during the 1911 college football season. In its first season under head coach Frank Thompson, the team compiled a 3–5 record (1–5 in intercollegiate games).  The team played its home games in Wake Forest, North Carolina

Schedule

References

Wake Forest
Wake Forest Demon Deacons football seasons
Wake Forest Baptists football